Bakwa is a district in Farah province, Afghanistan. Its population, which is majority Pashtun with a Tajik minority, was estimated at 79,529 in November 2004. The district center is Sultani Bakwa. It is situated at an altitude of 726 m.

War in Afghanistan 
According to the Afghan government, airstrikes in 2019 against the Taliban in the district destroyed 68 drug labs and killed 150 insurgents. Governor Abdul Ghafoor Mujahid claimed 45 civilians were killed in the strikes, which Defense spokesman Qais Mangal denied.

In 2021, the Taliban captured the district as part of the 2021 Taliban offensive.

Gallery

References 

 UNHCR District Profile, compiled September–November 2004, accessed 2006-06-06 (PDF).

External links 

 Map of Settlements  AIMS, May 2002

Districts of Farah Province